Money Mad may refer to:

 Money Mad (1908 film), an American crime film directed by D. W. Griffith
 Money Mad (1918 film), a 1918 American mystery film directed by Hobart Henley
 Money Mad (1934 film), a British drama film directed by Frank Richardson

See also
 Mad Money, a finance television series hosted by Jim Cramer
 Mad Money (film), a 2008 film
 Mad Money (play), an 1869 Russian play
 Money Madness (disambiguation)